Bonson is a surname. Notable people with the surname include:

 Joe Bonson (1934–1991), English footballer
 Matthew Bonson, Australian politician

See also
 Benson (surname)
 Bronson (name)